The 1996–97 season was Cardiff City F.C.'s 70th season in the Football League. They competed in the 24-team Division Three, then the fourth tier of English football, finishing seventh, before being beaten 4–2 on aggregate by Northampton Town in the play-offs.

The season saw Cardiff sack two managers during the course of the year. Phil Neal continued in his role from the previous season before leaving the club, taking the role of assistant manager at Manchester City, and was replaced by Russell Osman. However Osman himself lasted just five matches and was replaced by Kenny Hibbitt, the man who had made way for Phil Neal the previous season.

Players

 
  
  

First team squad.

League standings

Results by round

Fixtures and results

Third Division

Source

Third Division Play Offs

League Cup

FA Cup

Auto Windscreens Shield

See also
List of Cardiff City F.C. seasons

References

Bibliography

Welsh Football Data Archive

  

1996-97
Welsh football clubs 1996–97 season
1996–97 Football League Third Division by team